Live at the Fillmore East 1970, is the fourth live album by Ten Years After recorded in February 1970.  This double-disc album features many rock and blues covers, such as Chuck Berry's "Sweet Little Sixteen", and "Roll Over Beethoven" and also Willie Dixon's "Spoonful", which was also covered by Cream on their albums Fresh Cream and Wheels of Fire.  Unlike Ten Years After studio album A Space In Time - which was released next year, in 1971 - Live at the Fillmore East does not have as much of a pop sound, but more of a 1950s blues sound.

Track listing

Disc One
"Love Like a Man" (Alvin Lee) - 9:34
"Good Morning Little Schoolgirl" (Sonny Boy Williamson) - 7:26
"Working On The Road" (Alvin Lee) - 3:34
"The Hobbit" (Ric Lee) - 10:52
"50,000 Miles Beneath My Brain" (Alvin Lee) - 9:58
"Skoobly-Oobley-Doobob" (Alvin Lee) / "I Can't Keep From Crying Sometimes" (Al Kooper) / "Extension On One Chord" (Alvin Lee, R. Lee, L. Lyons, M.G. Churchill) - 19:30

Disc Two
"Help Me (Sonny Boy Williamson II, Willie Dixon, Ralph Bass)" - 16:05
"I'm Going Home" (Alvin Lee) - 11:57
"Sweet Little Sixteen" (Chuck Berry) - 4:38
"Roll Over Beethoven" (Chuck Berry) - 4:44
"I Woke Up This Morning" (Alvin Lee) - 8:09
"Spoonful" (Willie Dixon) - 8:00

Personnel
Ten Years After
Alvin Lee - guitar, vocals
Chick Churchill - organ
Leo Lyons - bass
Ric Lee - drums

References

Live at the Fillmore East albums
Ten Years After albums
2001 live albums